Jerxheim is a municipality in the district of Helmstedt, in Lower Saxony, Germany.

Personalities
Kurt Meyer Knights Cross holder, SS General, convicted war criminal

References

Helmstedt (district)